"Beautiful Dreamer" is a parlor song by American songwriter Stephen Foster. It was published posthumously in March 1864, by Wm. A. Pond & Co. of New York. The first edition states on its title page that it is "the last song ever written by Stephen C. Foster, composed but a few days prior to his death." However, Carol Kimball, the author of Song, points out that the first edition's copyright is dated 1862, which suggests, she writes, that the song was composed and readied for publication two years before Foster's death. There are at least 20 songs, she observes, that claim to be Foster's last, and it is unknown which is indeed his last. The song is set in  time with a broken chord accompaniment.

The song tells of a lover serenading a "Beautiful Dreamer" who is oblivious to worldly cares and may actually be dead. Foster's works feature many dead young women, including his sister Charlotte and "Jeanie". Helen Lightner writes, "This sentimental ballad is folk-like in character with its repetitious but lovely melody and its basic harmonic accompaniment ... The quiet and calm of this mood is portrayed by the monotony of the arpeggiated accompaniment, by the repetitiveness of the melodic pattern, and by the strophic form itself."

Lyrics

Recordings, film, and literature

Recordings

The song has been recorded by Bing Crosby with John Scott Trotter & his Orchestra (March 22, 1940); The Nutmegs; Steve Conway with Jack Byfield & His Orchestra; Thomas Hampson with Jay Ungar (mandolin), David Alpher (piano), and Molly Mason (guitar); John Leyton (with revised lyrics by Ken Lewis and John Carter); Jerry Lee Lewis; Slim Whitman; and Roy Orbison on the album In Dreams (a top ten Australian single in 1964). The documentary Beautiful Dreamer: Brian Wilson and the Story of Smile is named after the song, and in the documentary Brian Wilson quips that the first letters of the words "Beautiful Dreamer, Wake" compare with his own initials, Brian Douglas Wilson. The song is also featured on Marty Robbins' posthumous album Long, Long Ago (1984) and on Ray Price's posthumous farewell album Beauty Is... Ray Price, the Final Sessions (2014).

Jim Reeves recorded a version while on tour in South Africa in 1962, sung in Afrikaans under the title "Bolandse Nooientjie". (A brief translation is fraught; "lass of the hinterland" is one possibility.) Although Reeves could not speak Afrikaans, this was remedied by South African composer and songwriter Gilbert Gibson, who stood behind Reeves and whispered the words of the song to him, who would then sing the same words into the microphone.

Bing Crosby included the song in a medley on his album On the Sentimental Side (1962).

Gerry Goffin and Jack Keller wrote a doo-wop version for Tony Orlando which took considerable liberties with the original; the opening quatrain, for instance is "Beautiful Dreamer/Wake unto me/Can't you see me, baby/I'm on my bended knee." Orlando released this version as a single in 1962 and it quickly became a regular part of the Beatles' set list, from 1962 through the Beatles Winter 1963 Helen Shapiro Tour in early 1963. A recording of a 1963 Beatles performance of the song on the BBC was released in 2013 on their album On Air – Live at the BBC Volume 2. Rory Storm and The Hurricanes also featured the song in their live performances. This version has been recorded by Billy J. Kramer with The Dakotas.

Bobby Darin recorded a bluesy version of the song with all-new lyrics, but the song was unreleased until 1999 (on the album Bobby Darin: The Unreleased Capitol Sides). No attribution is given for the new lyrics; one possibility is that Darin might have written these himself. These lyrics tell about a lonely woman who dreams of a love of her own, and a lonely man who dreams of love too. The reference to a queen is retained in Darin's version, asking if the woman is a "queen without a throne".

Udo Jürgens recorded a German language version as Beautiful Dreamgirl in 1964. Wolfgang Roloff aka "Ronny" (1930-2011) another one in 1975: "Träumendes Mädchen" ("Dreaming Girl").

Film
Bette Davis hums the song in her Academy Award-winning performance, Best Actress, of 1938, Jezebel.

The song appeared in An American Tail in the scene of the cats underground hideout being played on the piano.

The song was central to the plot of the film Mighty Joe Young, as it is used throughout the film to calm the title character, a large gorilla.

The tune is a motif in the film The Secret Life of Walter Mitty (1947 film), where Virginia Mayo's character plays it at key points.

In the 1952 biopic of Stephen Foster entitled I Dream of Jeanie, there is a scene where Stephen Foster, played by Bill Shirley, sings this song as a serenade to one of his two love interests in the film. A recording of the Foster version was released with the "Truth or Square" episode of SpongeBob SquarePants featuring the voice of Roger Bumpass in 2009.

In the climax of the cult pageant film Drop Dead Gorgeous, a rendition of the song by Mandy Barnett can be heard over the chaos of beauty queens destroying a building.

In The Little Rascals Save The Day, Alfalfa sings the song on the last day of school.

The song is used in the 1994 movie Cabin Boy starring Chris Elliott and directed by Adam Resnick.

The song is used as a recurring theme in Winchester (2018) with Helen Mirren.

The song is used as a theme song in the 2020 Netflix movie Lost Girls.

The song is also used in Gone with the Wind (1939); Second Chorus (1940); An Old-Fashioned Girl (1949); Shane (1953); Goin' South (1978); Duel in the Sun; The Night of the Grizzly; She Done Him Wrong (1933); Picnic (1955); The Death Collector (1976); How to Make an American Quilt (1995); Children of the Dust (1995), Batman (1989); The Secret Life of Walter Mitty (1947); the animated An American Tail; Friends 'Til the End; Office Space; the Marx Brothers's Go West (1940); The Old Chisholm Trail; The Naked Spur; and Domino Kid (1957); Peggy Sue Got Married (1986); and Transamerica (2005). In Young Frankenstein (1974), the song is also referenced, when the ghoulish Marty Feldman, hearing a shrill and anguished female wail from a remote dungeon, smiles and (almost) sings "beautiful screamer...". In Kansas Raiders (1950) the song is played on harmonica around the campfire in one scene. In Lorelei (film) (2021) the song is featured in several scenes and gives the film its title.

Television
The song is used several times in the TV show Drake & Josh.

An excerpt from the song was also sung by Colonel Paul Foster (Michael Billington (actor)) in an episode of UFO (TV series) entitled "Ordeal".

The song is featured as a cattle lullaby sung by Elsa Dutton in 1883 (TV series).

The instrumental version of this song, aired on the episode, "Cain," on the television series, Gunsmoke. Its first airing was March 9, 1957.

The song was also covered in the show The Magicians (American TV series), sung as a lullaby during Season 4, Episode 10, "All That Hard, Glossy Armor."

The song was sung on the show New Amsterdam (2018 TV series), during a blood drive on Season 3, Episode 5, "Blood, Sweat & Tears"

Video games
The song is used in Far Cry's New Dawn video game, where Prosperity girl sings this song.

Literature
The song is pivotal to E. B. White's 1970 novel The Trumpet of the Swan. Louis the trumpeter swan learns the tune during his long journey to find his voice via a stolen trumpet and a chalk slate. In a climactic scene, he belts out its poetry on his trumpet at dawn, declaring his love in the Philadelphia Zoo to the beautiful swan Serena, the object of his long unrequited love. White also includes the public domain sheet music in the novel, perhaps to encourage similarly dramatic loving gestures. The song was also used in The Diviners book 2, Lair of Dreams by Libba Bray.

References

1864 songs
American songs
Bing Crosby songs
Jerry Lee Lewis songs
Jim Reeves songs
Parlor songs
Roy Orbison songs
Slim Whitman songs
Songs released posthumously
Songs written by Stephen Foster
The Beatles songs
Tony Orlando songs